Pedro St. James, Pedro St. James Castle, or Pedro's Castle is the oldest existing stone building in the Cayman Islands.

History
Pedro St. James was built in 1780 by an Englishman named William Eden. Although it is not known why and how Eden came to Cayman, he became sufficiently prosperous for his small land holding near Spotts to be marked on the first map of Grand Cayman in 1773 as Edens. Using slave labour, Eden styled the home as a small scale great house of the kind then found on plantations in Jamaica. The house received its name due to its location along Pedro Point.

Being the largest home on the island at the time, Pedro St. James was a key meeting place for principal inhabitants, eventually becoming the home of the first elected parliament of the islands in December 1831, causing it to be known as "The Birthplace of Democracy in the Cayman Islands".

On 3 May 1835, the proclamation ending slavery in the British Empire (including the Cayman Islands) was read atop the iconic stone staircase of the great house.

  During the 20th century the site continued to be privately owned, but the building was reduced to ruin after decades of neglect. In the 1960s, 1970s and 1980s the house underwent extensive alterations as a tourist attraction and restaurant. It was in these modern times the property became known as "Pedro Castle", being renamed and refurbished to look like a castle by businessman Thomas "Tom" Hubbell.

Restoration
In 1991 the Cayman Islands government purchased Pedro St. James with the aim of preserving and restoring it to its 18th-century grandeur as a national historic site. The three-story building and its verandas were rebuilt and reconstructed in the original 18th-century style and is the most extensive restoration project in Cayman history. The property stands today in its restored state as a historic landmark and a dynamic piece of Caymanian history and heritage.

The landmark contains a visitors centre, theatre, exhibits, a gift shop, restaurant and bar. It is a popular venue for weddings and social events.

Photo Gallery

References

Buildings and structures in the Cayman Islands
Houses completed in 1780
History of the Cayman Islands